Pollanisus acharon is a moth of the family Zygaenidae. It is only known from the type specimen, a female probably collected in Cooktown in north-eastern Queensland, Australia.

The length of the forewings is about 7 mm for females.

External links
Australian Faunal Directory
Zygaenid moths of Australia: a revision of the Australian Zygaenidae

acharon
Moths of Australia
Moths described in 1775
Taxa named by Johan Christian Fabricius